Magnús Þór Hafsteinsson (born May 29, 1964) is an Icelandic politician active in the Liberal Party (Frjálslyndi flokkurinn).

He has also worked as a reporter for the public TV news and is educated as a biologist.

External links
Frjálslyndi flokkurinn (English)

1964 births
Living people
Magnus Thor Hafsteinsson
Magnus Thor Hafsteinsson